Bisacquino (Sicilian: Busacchinu) is a town and comune in the Metropolitan City of Palermo in Sicily, Italy. The economy is based on agriculture and products are sold in abundance in the main town including cereals, olives, vegetables, almonds, hazel nuts and wine-grapes. Sheep breeding is also active in Bisacquino.

People
 The Italian-American film director Frank Capra (1897–1991) was born in Bisacquino.

References

Municipalities of the Metropolitan City of Palermo